William Hulle (fl. 1397) of Lancing, West Sussex, was an English politician.

He was a Member (MP) of the Parliament of England for New Shoreham in September 1397.

References

Year of birth missing
Year of death missing
English MPs September 1397
People from Lancing, West Sussex
People from Shoreham-by-Sea